Na Hom  is a tambon (subdistrict) located in the westernmost area of Thung Si Udom district, in Ubon Ratchathani Province, Thailand. In 2021, it had a population of 4,640 people. Neighbouring subdistricts are (clockwise from the south) Tha Khlo, Thung Thoeng, Nong Om, and Khok Chamrae.

History

Following the 1992 separation of five districts from Det Udom: Thung Thoeng, Nong Om, Na Kasem, Khok Chamrae, and Kut Ruea to form a minor district (king amphoe) called "Thung Si Udom," some communities in tambon Thung Thoeng preferred to remain affiliated with the original district, so the central government decided to split the tambon into two portions, the upper portion of which is now Thung Thoeng and was transferred back to Det Udom in the following year, while the lower region, which consisted of nine villages, was formed a new subdistrict called "Na Hom," and has been governed by Thung Si Udom since then. 

Geography
The tambon is located in the western region of the Thung Si Udom district, on the undulating land between the low river plains of the Lam Dom Yai River (ลำโดมใหญ่) in the east and of the Huai Khayung Creek (ห้วยขะยุง) in the west.

Administration
The subdistrict of Na Hom is divided into eight administrative villages (mubans; หมู่บ้าน), one of which, Na Hom village, was further divided into three community groups (Mu; หมู่). The entire area is governed by the Subdistrict Administrative Organization of Na Hom (องค์การบริหารส่วนตำบลนาห่อม; Na Hom SAO).

As of the 2021 census, it had a population of 4,640 people with 1,451 households. The following is a list of the subdistrict's mubans, which roughly correspond to the villages.

Chief Executive
The following is a list of the Chief Executives of the Subdistrict Administrative Organization of Na Hom since its establishment in 1997.

References

Tambon of Ubon Ratchathani Province